Doris Hall may refer to:
Doris McKellar, Australian photographer, born Doris Hall
Doris Hall (artist), enamellist and wife of Kálmán Kubinyi